Lee Sang-Hee (born 18 July 1988) is a South Korean football defender for Songwol FC.

Club career
Lee, a draftee from the 2011 K-League draft intake, was selected by Daejeon Citizen for the 2011 season.  He marked his first appearance for Daejeon Citizen with a yellow card in the club's loss in the third group match of the K-League Cup, against Seongnam Ilhwa Chunma.  Lee's debut in the K-League itself was in round 10, on 14 May, and he promptly earned the ire of the referee when he collected a red card for a foul late in the first half.  With his side reduced to 10 men, Lee had to watch from the sidelines as the Chunnam Dragons scored two goals in the second half to come out winners.

Club career statistics

References

External links

1988 births
Living people
Association football defenders
South Korean footballers
K League 1 players
Daejeon Hana Citizen FC players
Gimcheon Sangmu FC players
Incheon United FC players